Goodway is an unincorporated community in Monroe County, Alabama, United States. Goodway had a post office until it closed on December 31, 1988; it still has its own ZIP code, 36449.

References

Unincorporated communities in Monroe County, Alabama
Unincorporated communities in Alabama